Allsvenskan is the Swedish second division in men's team handball. Earlier, the name was used by the top division. The league is organized by the Swedish Handball Federation.

Teams for season 2020–21

Hammarby IF HF
IFK Karlskrona
Amo HK
Kungälvs HK
VästeråsIrsta HF
Skånela IF
Anderstorps SK
HK Torslanda Elit
Vinslövs HK
Rimbo HK Roslagen
LIF Lindesberg
Tyresö Handboll
Kärra HF
AIK Handboll

References

Sweden, men
Handall Allsvenskan, men
Professional sports leagues in Sweden